National Primary Route 18, or just Route 18 (or ) is a National Road Route of Costa Rica, located in the Guanacaste province.

Description
In Guanacaste province the route covers Nicoya canton (Mansión, Quebrada Honda districts), Cañas canton (Porozal district), Abangares canton (Las Juntas, Colorado districts).

The La Amistad de Taiwán Bridge, financed, designed and built by Taiwan is located on this route.

References

Highways in Costa Rica